Vinícius Szeuczuk Ribeiro (born 5 August 1997), known as Vinícius Guarapuava, is a Brazilian professional footballer who plays as a centre-back for Aparecidense.

Professional career
Vinícius Guarapuava is a youth product of Chapecoense, and began his senior career with them in 2017. He had loans with the sides Guarani Aires, São Gabriel, and Concórdia from 2018 to 2019. He moved to Glória on 11 January 2020. After a short stint with Inter-SM in 2020, he moved to Azuriz in 2021, and that same year moved to Paraná. He returned to Azuriz once more on 25 January 2021. On 12 June 2022, he signed a three year contract with Primeira Liga side Portimonense.

References

External links
 

.

1997 births
Living people
People from Guarapuava
Brazilian footballers
Association football defenders
Associação Chapecoense de Futebol players
Esporte Clube Guarani players
São Gabriel Futebol Clube players
Concórdia Atlético Clube players
Grêmio Esportivo Glória players
Azuriz Futebol Clube players
Paraná Clube players
Portimonense S.C. players
Associação Atlética Aparecidense players
Campeonato Brasileiro Série C players
Campeonato Brasileiro Série D players
Campeonato Paranaense players
Brazilian expatriate footballers
Brazilian expatriates in Portugal